Hub Dam is a reservoir on the Hub River. It is situated 56 km from Karachi city in Karachi and Hub District  on Sindh and Balochistan provinces border. The dam is extended to 24300 acres with gross storage capacity of 857000 acre feet. It is the Pakistan's third-largest dam (source?). It is an important source that provides the drinking water to the metropolitan city Karachi.

In 1974, the government of Sindh declared the area around dam as a wildlife sanctuary. The sanctuary is about 27219 hectors in size. It is favorable area for feeding and nesting for Cranes, Pelicans, Ducks and Waders. It also an important habitat of migratory birds. The Dam was designated a Ramsar site on 1 May 2001.

Hub Dam is also a tourist resort. On weekend holidays many people from Karachi visit to enjoy picnics, swimming and fishing. A rest house of WAPDA is also located there for tourists stay.

In August 2018, Wapda to enhance Hub Dam's storage capacity and to setup small hydroelectric power project at the dam but due to negligence no ground work have started yet as of August 2020.

Historical records
Before winters rains in February and March 2019 the level of water in the dam had dropped to 276 ft. A spell of rains in southwestern province of Balochistan in February and March 2019 has led to increase in the water level at Hub dam, raising the level to 34890 feet by 70 feet till March 3, 2019. The dam's water level rose close to its maximum capacity of 340 feet after almost 13 years on 27 August 2020. The dam's water level rose close to its maximum capacity of 335 feet on 18 July 2021.

See also
 List of dams and reservoirs in Pakistan
 Karachi Bulk Water Supply Project
 Hub District
 Hub River
 Hub, Balochistan
 Hub Tehsil
 Hub Dam Wildlife Sanctuary

References

External links
 Wild life of Pakistan
 Eco Tourism Development In Pakistan

Dams in Balochistan, Pakistan
Lasbela District
Ramsar sites in Pakistan
Dams completed in 1981
Dams in Karachi